Cloud 19 is the debut mixtape by American singer and songwriter Kehlani, who released it as a free digital download on August 26, 2014, and is widely recognized as launching their music career.

The mixtape ranked at twenty-eighth on Complexs list of the "50 Best Albums of 2014", and was also listed among Pitchforks "Overlooked Mixtapes 2014". 
To commemorate the seventh anniversary on August 26, 2021, Kehlani's label Atlantic Records acquired the masters of mixtape and re-released "Cloud 19" on streaming services.

Promotion
The first song from the mixtape, "Get Away", was premiered on HotNewHipHop's website on July 16, 2014. A remix version featuring American rapper G-Eazy was published on November 21, 2014. The song, "FWU", had a music video released on November 3, 2014 and directed by Martín Estévez. David Drake of Complex named "FWU" as the third dope song you should be hearing everywhere soon. The music video for "1st Position" was directed by David Camarena, and it was released on January 20, 2015 as the last music video from the mixtape.

Track listing
The tracklisting and credits for the album was revealed by HotNewHipHop.

 On the streaming edition of the mixtape, "Act A Fool" was omitted from the tracklist.

References

External links
 

Kehlani albums
Debut mixtape albums
2014 mixtape albums
Self-released albums
Albums free for download by copyright owner